Elephant Pass Fort (Alimankada Balakotuwa) was a small fort in the strategically important spot as it linked Jaffna peninsula to the mainland. It was built by the Dutch in 1776 on the banks of the Jaffna lagoon.

The fort was served as a defensive structure to protect the Jaffna peninsula. It was like a well-fortified stockade or a watch post. It had two bastions, and each bastion was equipped with  four cannons. Elephant Pass Fort was linearly located with Fort Beschutter and Fort Pass Pyl in the narrow part of the peninsula. During the British rule, the fort was used as a rest house. It was destroyed during the Sri Lankan civil war.

References

External links 
  

Military installations established in 1776
Dutch forts in Sri Lanka
Forts in Northern Province, Sri Lanka